Sukhumi was a Hansa A Type cargo ship which was built as Benue in 1944 by A Vuyk & Zonen, Capelle aan den Ijssel, Overijssel, Netherlands for the Deutsche Afrika Linien, Hamburg. She was seized as a prize of war in 1945, passing to the Ministry of War Transport and renamed Empire Gable. Allocated to the Soviet Union in 1946, she served until 1969 when she was scrapped at Bo'ness, Lothian, United Kingdom.

Description

The ship was propelled by a compound steam engine, which had two cylinders of 42 cm (16 inches) and two cylinders of 90 cm (35 inches) diameter by 90 cm (35 inches) stroke. The engine was built by Gebroeders Stork & Co., N.V., Hengelo, Overijssel, Netherlands.

History
Benue was built in 1944 as yard number 688 by A Vuyk & Zonen, Capelle aan den IJssel South Holland, Netherlands under orders from Deutsche Werft, Hamburg, Germany. She was built for the Deutsche Afrika Linien, Hamburg. She was launched on 2 February and completed on 25 July.

Benue was seized as a prize of war at Cuxhaven on 7 June 1945 and was passed to the Ministry of War Transport. She was renamed Empire Gable. Her port of registry was London and she was operated under the management of Angel, Son & Co. Ltd., Cardiff.

In February 1946, she was allocated to the Soviet Union under the Potsdam Agreement. She was renamed Sukhumi and was placed under the management of the Murmansk Shipping Company, and the Code Letters UOOL were allocated. In February 1961, a sailor from Sukhumi rescued a boy who fell into the water at Granton, Lothian, United Kingdom when his raft collided with the ship. With their introduction in the 1960s, Sukhumi was allocated the IMO Number 5343421. She served until 1969, arriving at Bo'ness, Lothian on 27 November for scrapping by P & W MacLellan.

References

1944 ships
Ships built in the Netherlands
World War II merchant ships of Germany
Steamships of Germany
Empire ships
Ministry of War Transport ships
Merchant ships of the United Kingdom
Steamships of the United Kingdom
Merchant ships of the Soviet Union
Steamships of the Soviet Union
Murmansk Shipping Company